Anuradha (Kannada: ಅನುರಾಧ) is a 1967 Indian Kannada film, directed by Aruru Pattabhi and produced by Pandari Bai. The film stars Raja Shankar, Jayanthi, K. S. Ashwath and Pandari Bai in the lead roles. The film has musical score by Rajan Nagendra. Dr. Rajkumar appeared as himself in a cameo role in this movie. This was his first guest appearance role in a movie.

Cast
 Pandari Bai as Nagu
 Mynavathi as Anuradha
 B. Ramadevi as Venkamma
 K. S. Ashwath as Sadanand Rao
 Raja Shankar as Ramesh
 Narasimharaju as Subba Rao
 Bangalore Nagesh
 Jayanthi as Vimala (cameo)
 Dr.Rajkumar in a cameo

Soundtrack
The music was composed by Rajan–Nagendra.

2. Gummana Karayadire PBS and S Janaki Lyrics: Purandara Dasaru

References

External links
 

1960s Kannada-language films